Al-Beroni University (AU;) is located in the small town of Kohistan (population range of under 2,500 inhabitants), Kapisa Province, Afghanistan, about 64 km north of the capital Kabul. Alberoni University is a public institute of higher education, and was inaugurated in 1998 by the Afghan Ministry of Higher Education, Al Beroni University (AU) is a very small ( enrollment range:  1000-1999 students) coeducational Afghan higher education institution. The university is named after Abu Rayhan al-Biruni, a renowned polymath scholar who lived in the 11th century. Al Beroni University (AU) offers courses and programs leading to officially recognized higher education degrees in several areas of study. The AU beginning with a faculty of Medical and Engineering. It is the fifth largest university in Afghanistan after Kabul University, Nangarhar University, Balkh University and Herat University. The university has 9 faculties and 32 departments. The most popular fields of study is law, medicine and engineering.

Dr. Abu Najam Niazi is tenth and current chancellor of university.

Faculties and Departments
Alberoni University has  9 faculties and 32 departments, the students are studying in different faculties and different fields. Right now Alberoni University has 147 faculty members and 4682 students.

Alberoni University faculties

1. Faculty of Medical (Dean of Faculty: Associated professor Dr. Najeebullah Shafaq)
Departments:
 Department of General Medicine (HoD: Asst. prof. Dr. Abdul Moid Kohistani)
 Department of General Surgery
 Department of Para-clinic

2. Faculty of Engineering  (Dean of Faculty: Assct. Prof.Engr.Mateen Haqbeen)
 Departments:
 Department of Electrical and Electronic Engineering (HoD: Asst. Prof. Engr. Yasir Hamwar)
 Department of Civil Engineering (HoD: Asst. Prof.Engr.Hasib Jahish)

3. Faculty of Education (Dean of Faculty: Ascot. Prof. Qadir Wahab)
 Departments:
 Department of Mathematics
 Department of Physics
 Department of Chemistry
 Department of History
 Department of Geography
 Department of Islamic Studies
 Department of Biology
4. Faculty of Economics (Acting Dean of Faculty: Prof.Dr.Naim Sharif, Ph.D.)

5. Faculty of Law and Political Science (Dean of Faculty: Ascot. Bismillah Mateen)
 Departments:
 Department of International Relations
 Department of Public Law
 Department of Private Law
 Department of Criminal Law

6. Faculty of Literature (Dean of Faculty: Ascot.Prof.)
 Departments:
 Department of Farsi Language
 Department of Pashto Language
 Department of English Language
 Department of Arabic Language

7. Faculty of Journalism
 Departments:
 Department of Press
 Department of Radio & TV

8. Faculty of Agriculture (Dean of Faculty: Ascot. Prof.FazelRab Aria)
 Department of Horticulture Sciences
 Department of Agriculture Economics
 Department of Plant Sciences
 Department of Animal Sciences]

9. Faculty of Sharia Law  (Dean of Faculty: Prof. Dr. Rafe Alimi, Ph.D.)

Students statistics in 2015

Alberoni University strives to serve the public and is dedicated to building a prosperous and well educated society by generation of knowledge through conducting research, dissemination of knowledge through training, and to advancing applications of knowledge in the private and public sectors. Alberoni University trying to build its institutional development more efficiently and effectively and it has 9 faculties with about 32 Departments. AU has access to about appropriate facilities and equipment in order to realize its commitments: a new campus, modern and beautiful buildings for its 3 faculties, advanced laboratories for Medical, Engineering and Education faculties, rich libraries, well equipped lecture rooms, and most importantly, capable lecturers who make our university a superior institute.

Notable people 
 
 
Abdul Malik Hamwar ex-minister of Ministry of Rural Rehabilitation and Development from December 2001 - July 2002.

Controversy over Chancellor of University Selection  
According to Civil Higher Education Law of Afghanistan which published in Official Gazette No. 1195 on November 11, 2015  The head of the institute of higher education in Afghanistan should be selected from high academic rank members of faculty of the institute, if they have the academic rank of professor, professor, etc.
through free, secret and direct elections to the majority of vote of academic members of that institute of higher education for a period of three years. However, since 2001 it is selected by President of Afghanistan.
In 2021, the chancellor of Al-Biruni University resigned from his position due to threats from Taliban fighters. He previously sent a complaint letter about the threatening behavior of the representative Abdul Baqi Haqqani to Ministry of Higher Education.

International Partner universities
The cooperation, especially with Iranian universities is more focused for faculty exchange and networking. In 2016, the university signed a partnership with University of Mazandaran to promote  faculty exchange and networking. 

  University of Mazandaran

See also
List of universities in Afghanistan

References

External links

Educational institutions established in 1998
1998 establishments in Afghanistan
Universities in Afghanistan
Public universities in Afghanistan